Catocala kaki is a moth in the family Erebidae. It is found in China (Shaanxi).

References

kaki
Moths described in 2003
Moths of Asia